Pitcairnia vallisoletana is a plant species in the genus Pitcairnia. This species is endemic to Mexico.

References

vallisoletana
Flora of Mexico